Current (Finco Services, Inc.) is a New York City-based financial services and software development company (FinTech). It provides mobile banking services through its partner bank, Choice Financial Group, Member FDIC. 

Current was founded by Stuart Sopp June 2015. In 2020, the Wall Street Journal reported a valuation of $750 million, and reported that Current "is the latest beneficiary of this trend [toward mobile consumer banking]". 

Current has no physical branches. As of December 2022, Current had over 4 million account holders. Account-holders are issued Visa debit cards and have access to an online banking system accessible via the mobile app for Android or iOS.

Like competitors Chime and Square, It was also the beneficiary of the 2020 COVID pandemic, which drove consumers away from brick-and-mortar alternatives. As of April 2021, its valuation stands at $2.2 billion.

History 
Stuart Sopp founded Current in 2015 in New York City to provide alternative banking services to traditional banks. 

Current’s first product, a debit card for teens controlled by parents, launched in May 2017.

Current launched its personal accounts for adults in February 2019, which featured early access to wages with direct deposit, fee-free overdraft (up to $200), no minimum balance requirements, and instant removals of gas holds that stations put on debit cards. 

In 2020, Current became the first U.S. based consumer fintech to launch a points reward system based on debit, which allows its members to earn points redeemable for cash back in their Current accounts, for purchases at over 14,000 merchants nationwide, including national retailers such as Subway, Cold Stone Creamery, and Rite Aid, as well as thousands of local retailers.

In January 2022, Current launched a 4% APY savings product.

In October 2022, Current launched crypto trading without fees in partnership with Zero Hash, giving its over four million members access to buy and sell dozens of coins on its platform without paying trading fees and with instant liquidity from trades.

Also in October 2022, Current announced it was now doing its own processing directly with Visa after completing a seamless, live BIN migration to the Visa DPS Forward platform from a third party processor.

Operations

Financial 
Services include downloadable software that enables peer-to-peer money transfers, and processing electronic fund transfers, including credit cards, electronic checks and debit cards.

On December 12, 2019, the company applied for patent 16424341 / 20190378121, "Cryptographic Technology Platform And Methods For Providers To Enable Users To Monetize Their Data" that would cryptographically give end-users, i.e., customers, an option to maintain complete personal data privacy or opt to monetize all or part of it.

Its two primary revenue sources are interchange fees and a subscription option for members looking to access credit.

See also 

 Financial technology
 Payment card industry
 Online banking

References 

Financial technology
Financial markets
Financial services
Technology in society